κ-Bungarotoxin (often written κ-Bgt; historically also called toxin F) is a protein neurotoxin of the bungarotoxin family that is found in the venom of the many-banded krait, a snake found in Taiwan. κ-Bungarotoxin is a high affinity antagonist of nicotinic acetylcholine receptors (nAChRs), particularly  of CHRNA3; it causes a post-synaptic blockade of neurotransmission. Although there is significant variability in the clinical effects of snake bites, neuromuscular paralysis and respiratory failure are associated with krait bites.

Discovery 
κ-Bungarotoxin was first reported in 1983 as a component of the venom of Bungarus multicinctus that differed in biological effect from the previously known α-bungarotoxin: κ-bungarotoxin, but not α-bungarotoxin, was capable of impeding nicotinic signaling in the chick ciliary ganglion. Bungarotoxin toxin was designated "kappa" as an allusion to the Latin word kiliaris ("from the eye"), and to the root of "ciliary". Separately identified toxins designated "toxin F" and "bungarotoxin 3.1" were identified by protein sequencing as identical to κ-bungarotoxin.

Mechanism and biological effects 
κ-Bungarotoxin binds to the nicotinic acetylcholine receptors of the autonomic ganglia, predominantly to the nicotinic receptor subunit alpha 3 (CHRNA3) and to a lesser extent alpha 4. Two distinct binding surfaces, both on the N-terminal extracellular face of the receptor subunit, have been identified.

κ-Bungarotoxin is a receptor antagonist, meaning it blocks the normal response of the receptor to acetylcholine, which inhibits neurotransmission and therefore causes neuromuscular paralysis. Like the α-bungarotoxins, κ-bungarotoxin causes a post-synaptic blockade of signaling; this is in contrast to the β-bungarotoxins which induce a pre-synaptic block. The distinction between the effects of α-bungarotoxin and κ-bungarotoxin was first identified functionally, as differences in effects on specific neural structures. The basis of this functional difference has been molecularly characterized as differences in receptor subtype specificity; the pentameric receptors are assembled from different distributions of subunits in neurons and in muscles.

Structure 
The κ-bungarotoxin polypeptide is 66 amino acids long and folds into an antiparallel beta sheet structure stabilized by five conserved disulfide bonds, a structural feature shared by many peptide toxins. Unlike other members of the bungarotoxin family, κ-bungarotoxin is a dimer.

References 

Neurotoxins
Nicotinic antagonists